The 1998–99 Iowa Hawkeyes men's basketball team represented the University of Iowa as members of the Big Ten Conference. The team was led by head coach Tom Davis, coaching in his 13th and final season at the school, and played their home games at Carver-Hawkeye Arena. They finished the season 20–10 overall and 9–7 in Big Ten play. The Hawkeyes received an at-large bid to the NCAA tournament as #5 seed in the West Region, losing in the Sweet Sixteen to the eventual National Champion UConn Huskies.

Roster

Schedule and results

|-
!colspan=8 style=| Non-conference regular season
|-

|-
!colspan=8 style=| Big Ten Regular Season

|-
!colspan=8 style=| Big Ten tournament

|-
!colspan=8 style=| NCAA tournament

Rankings

NBA draft

References

Iowa Hawkeyes
Iowa
Iowa Hawkeyes men's basketball seasons
Hawk
Hawk